Donald Joseph Bevan (January 16, 1920 Holyoke, Massachusetts – May 29, 2013 Studio City, California) was an American playwright whose works include the Broadway play Stalag 17, co-written with Edmund Trzcinski, and adapted as a movie in 1953. He was also the caricaturist for the celebrity wall at Sardi's restaurant in New York City for over 20 years, the third of four such artists employed by Sardi's.

A United States Army Air Forces veteran who served in World War II as a gunner of a Boeing B-17 Flying Fortress and as a prisoner of war in Germany after being shot down April 17, 1943, Bevan is buried at Riverside National Cemetery in Riverside, California.

See also
List of caricatures at Sardi's restaurant

References

External links
 
 
 

1920 births
2013 deaths
American caricaturists
United States Army Air Forces personnel of World War II
Burials at Riverside National Cemetery
20th-century American dramatists and playwrights
United States Army Air Forces soldiers
American prisoners of war in World War II
World War II prisoners of war held by Germany